Take Us Alive is a live album by the American rock band Extreme, first released in May 2010. The set features the final concert on the East Meets West Tour recorded at House of Blues in Boston on 8 August 2009. It has 17 tracks and four bonus DVD only tracks.

Guitarist Nuno Bettencourt said of the recording "We wanted to do something really special for our hometown fans that were there for us since the beginning... the club days. It was the last night of the tour and we couldn't think of a better way to celebrate than by bringing it back to where it all started... Boston."

Some audio parts were re-recorded in the studio for the cd/DVD release.

Track listing
"Decadence Dance" – 8:12
"Comfortably Dumb" - 5:23
"Rest In Peace" – 5:21
"It's A Monster" – 5:29
"Star" – 5:42
"Tell Me Something I Don't Know" – 7:59
"Medley: Kid Ego/Little Girls/Teacher's Pet" – 6:00
"Play with Me" – 9:06
"Midnight Express" – 4:10
"More Than Words" – 7:26
"Ghost" – 4:51
"Cupid's Dead" – 6:58
"Take Us Alive" – 6:04
"Flight Of The Wounded Bumblebee" – 1:51
"Get the Funk Out" – 7:37
"Am I Ever Gonna Change" – 6:57
"Hole Hearted" – 4:13

Bonus DVD track listing
"King of the Ladies" (music video)
"Interface" (music video)
"Run" (music video)
"Ghost" (music video)

Charts

References

External links
 Review

Extreme (band) albums
2010 live albums
2010 video albums
Live video albums
Frontiers Records live albums